Ziad Al-Khasawneh is a Jordanian lawyer who headed a team of twenty-two defense lawyers for former Iraqi President Saddam Hussein.

References

21st-century Jordanian lawyers
Year of birth missing (living people)
Living people
Place of birth missing (living people)